Fo Tan is a station on the  of the Mass Transit Railway (MTR) system in Hong Kong. The  is located parallel to Fo Tan, on the line's Racecourse branch.

During rush hour, some northbound trains terminate at this station before departing southwards. Some trains do not run through this station on race days, and are instead diverted to stop at the Racecourse.

History 
Fo Tan station opened on 15 February 1985, two years after the total electrification of the railway. It was featured at the end of the 1989 film Mr. Coconut, starring Tony Leung Ka-fai.

Fo Tan Goods Yard 

In addition, two tracks spur off at the northeast of the station, and lead into a goods yard north of the station. Freight trains stopped there regularly before their demise on the East Rail line in 2010; the yard has since been used occasionally for rolling stock deliveries.

Station layout 

The station has three tracks, with two island platforms between.

Trains normally stop at platforms 1 and 4. The centre track is used in the following occasions:
for special southbound departures during morning peak hours,
for southbound stopping when there are trains heading to/from the depot, or Racecourse station during race days, or
to serve as a buffer so that non-stop through trains can overtake local trains.

Entrances/exits 

Originally, the southern concourse was the only concourse in this station. Because the two concourses were built in separate years, they were not originally interconnected. MTR renovated the station in 2015, connecting the two concourses in the process. The new link opened on 12 December 2015.

Southern concourse
A: Fo Tan Railway House
Fo Tan Railway House, IVE (Sha Tin), Hong Kong Sports Institute, Jockey Club Ti-I College, Sha Tin Rowing Centre
B: Sui Fai Factory Estate
Sui Fai Factory Estate, Fo Tan Road, Fo Tan Tsuen, Shan Mei Street, Shatin Galleria, Sui Wo Court, Chun Yeung Estate

Northern concourse
C: The Palazzo
The Palazzo, Ficus Garden, Immigration and Registration of Persons, Jubilee Court, Jubilee Garden, Lok Lo Ha Village, Plaza Ascot, Royal Ascot
D: Au Pui Wan Street
Au Pui Wan Street, MTR Ho Tung Lau Depot, Wo Liu Hang Village

References 

Fo Tan
East Rail line
MTR stations in the New Territories
Former Kowloon–Canton Railway stations
Railway stations in Hong Kong opened in 1985
1985 establishments in Hong Kong